Dichomeris antisticta is a moth of the family Gelechiidae. It was described by Edward Meyrick in 1929. It is known from southern India.

The wingspan is about 17 mm. The forewings are light ochreous grey with the costal edge ochreous whitish from the base to beyond the middle. There is a small cloudy grey spot in the disc at one-fourth and the anterior stigmata are small, blackish, with the plical beneath the first discal, the second discal dark grey. There is an ochreous-whitish mark on the costa at two-thirds, preceded by some dark grey suffusion and with a very fine pale zigzag line from this to the tornus. There is a marginal series of black dots around the apical part of the costa and termen. The hindwings are rather dark grey.

The larvae feed on Terminalia tomentosa.

References

antisticta
Moths described in 1929
Moths of Asia